Evelyn Sharp may refer to:

Evelyn Sharp (aviator) (1919–1944), American aviator
Evelyn Sharp (businesswoman) (died 1997), American hotelier
Evelyn Sharp (suffragist) (1869–1955), British suffragist and author
Evelyn Sharp, Baroness Sharp (1903–1985), British civil servant
Evelyn Sharp / Artemis, a fictional character from Arrow